The Workers Revolutionary Party (Ergatiko Epanastatiko Komma, EEK) is a Trotskyist communist political party in Greece, taking part in the elections independently, since the departure from Radical Left Front (MERA, ΜΕΡΑ) coalition in spring of 2009. EEK does some cooperative work with the Front of the Greek Anticapitalist Left (ANTARSYA), which the rest of MERA joined in 2009.

The party's newspaper is Νέα Προοπτική (Nea Prooptiki, New Perspective).  Another of its publications is Επαναστατική Μαρξιστική Επιθεώρηση (Epanastatiki Marxistiki Epitheorisi, Revolutionary Marxist Review), a theoretical magazine. EEK also publishes classic Marxist writings.

Its youth section is OEN (Οργάνωση Επαναστατικής Νεολαίας, Organisation of Revolutionary Youth). OEN's monthly magazine is Konservokouti (Κονσερβοκούτι, Tincan), a title deliberately ridiculing far-right propaganda that used to claim for decades that the Left used tincans to cut their opponents' throat through the Greek Civil War.

The party concluded its 10th Congress in October 2008.
EEK's General Secretary is the prominent Trotskyist Savas Mihail Matsas, former secretary of the International Committee of the Fourth International.

EEK is the Greek Section of the Coordinating Committee for the Refoundation of the Fourth International.

History
ΕΕΚ's history goes back to 1964. The internal crisis of the 4th International was followed in 1958 by a crisis inside its Greek section,  ΚΔΚΕ – Κομμουνιστικό Διεθνιστικό Κόμμα Ελλάδας (Kommounistiko Diethnistiko Komma Elladas, Communist Internationalist Party of Greece) causing the departure of many members that rejected Pabloism and entrism sui generis. Among them were Trotskyist revolutionaries that were legends for the Greek movement since the 1920s, such as Loukas Karliaftis aka "Kostas Kastritis" or Mastroyiannis – Theotokatos. Also there were many youth industrial workers who created along with other mechanics a struggling workers organization and published the magazine "O Μηχανουργός" ("The Mechanic").

This group's successes were many, gaining power and control inside many workers' unions against Stalinism. Finally, the group of youth workers and the old veterans Trotskyists joined and created Συνδικαλιστικη Παραταξη – Εργατικη Πρωτοπορια (Syndicalist Union – Workers' Vanguard) in 1964. That was the legal title of the organization, due to the law 509 that prosecuted for high treason any organization that fought openly against the regime. The real, but illegal title, was ΕΔΕ – Επαναστατικη Διεθνιστικη Ενωση (Revolutionary Internationalist Union).

The newborn organization published the magazine "Ο Διεθνιστής" ("The Internationalist") and soon started to play a significant role in class war in Greece. They struggled inside the unions and participated in any fight such as the riot of July 1965. From the first moment ΕΔΕ sought contact and connected with the ICFI.

The dictatorship of 1967 gave a critical hit to EDE. Many members were arrested, prisoned and tortured, but the organization never stop to fight against the dictators illegally through publications, propaganda and by participating in the student revolt of November 1973. Others managed to escape abroad in European countries, where they continued the struggle. The fall of the junta in 1974, found EDE reorganized with an increase in numbers and structures. EDE published "Σοσιαλιστική Αλλαγή" ("Socialist Change") twice a week. EDE's youth section was Young Socialists.
In 1985, EDE transformed into a Leninist party, under its current name, EEK. In 1989, the EEK left the ICFI.

The party's position on the 2008 civil unrest in Greece was that it was a revolt.

Electoral results 

1 Participated in coalition with ANTARSYA.

References

External links
EEK web site

1985 establishments in Greece
Communist parties in Greece
Coordinating Committee for the Refoundation of the Fourth International
Far-left politics in Greece
Political parties established in 1985
Trotskyist organizations in Greece